The Spanish Missions in New Mexico  were a series of religious outposts in the Province of Santa Fe de Nuevo México — present day New Mexico. They were established by Franciscan friars under charter from the monarchs of the Spanish Empire and the government of the Viceroyalty of New Spain in a policy called Reductions to facilitate the conversion of Native Americans into  Christianity.

History

They attempted to Hispanicize the indigenous peoples. The affected included the rich cultures and tribes of: many of the 21 distinct Puebloan groups; the Tiwa; the Navajo; and the Apache. The missions also aimed to pacify resistance to the European invasion of the tribes' Pre-Columbian homelands and loss of traditions.  The missions introduced European livestock, fruits, vegetables, and small-scale industry into the Southwest region. They also introduced European diseases to which native people had little or no acquired immunity.

Fray Marcos de Niza, sent by Coronado, first saw the area now known as New Mexico in 1539. The first permanent settlement was Mission San Gabriel,  founded in 1598 by Juan de Oñate near what is now known as  Okay Owingeh, formerly known as the San Juan Pueblo.

Missions

Noted churches that were not missions
 El Santuario de Chimayó -  Site of an  Easter pilgrimage by foot to this holy spot every year. Not a mission;  founded c.1810 as a private chapel.
 San Francisco de Asís Mission Church - Church built between 1772 and 1816 and is located in the historic district of Ranchos de Taos.
 Santuario de Nuestra Señora de Guadalupe - Founded c. 1777; believed to be nation's oldest shrine dedicated to Our Lady of Guadalupe. Not a mission.

See also

On Spanish Missions in neighboring regions:
 Spanish missions in Arizona
 Spanish missions in Chihuahua and Coahuila
 Spanish missions in Texas
 Spanish missions in the Sonoran Desert (including Sonora and southern Arizona)

On general missionary history:
 Catholic Church and the Age of Discovery
 List of the oldest churches in Mexico

On colonial Spanish American history:
 Spanish colonization of the Americas
 California mission clash of cultures
Genízaros

External links
The Old Missions of New Mexico, 1998 article, St. Anthony Messenger
Sunlight and Adobe - Photographing New Mexico's Historic Missions New Mexico Photography Field School
History, Archdiocese of Santa Fe
Salinas Pueblo Missions National Monument
Spanish Mission Churches of New Mexico, 1915 book by L. Bradford Prince
Gran Quivira: A Blending of Cultures in a Pueblo Indian Village, a National Park Service Teaching with Historic Places (TwHP) lesson plan

References

 
Colonial New Mexico
New Spain
Colonial Mexico
Colonial United States (Spanish)
17th century in New Mexico
18th century in New Mexico
 M